Swiftopecten djoserus (Yoshimura, 2017) is an extinct species of bivalve belonging to the subclass Pteriomorphia and family Pectinidae that lived during the Late Pliocene, approximately 2.75 Ma. Their two valves have step-like growth ribs.

Origin of scientific name
Named for the Pyramid of Djoser in Saqqara, Egypt because the commarginal constrictions of Swiftopecten djoserus''''' resemble the unique stepwise form of this pyramid. A noun in apposition.

References

Yoshimura, Taro (2017). “A New Pliocene Species of Swiftopecten (Bivalvia: Pectinidae) from the Zukawa Formation in Toyama Prefecture, Central Japan”. Paleontological Research 21 (3): 293–303. 

Pectinidae
Prehistoric bivalves
Molluscs described in 2017